The Newman School is a private school in the Back Bay district of Boston, Massachusetts.

History
The Newman School was founded as Newman Preparatory School in 1945, the centennial of John Henry Cardinal Newman's conversion to Roman Catholicism, by Dr. J. Harry Lynch and a group of Catholic laymen, for the purpose of providing college preparation to veterans returning from service to their country in World War II. Over the years, Newman Prep evolved into a co-educational, diploma-granting program, and eventually began to accept younger students into the ninth grade. During the 1960s, the school operated The Newman School for Boys as a separate four-year (grades nine through twelve) and then six-year (grades seven through twelve) college preparatory school. Walter J. Egan was head of the School for Boys during most of its existence.

Now known as The Newman School, Newman provides a liberal arts education to a diverse group of approximately 200 American and international students. The student body is composed of students from the Greater Boston area with 50 percent of them coming from the city of Boston itself. International students come from Australia, Brazil, China, Croatia, Czech Republic, Germany, Greece, Hong Kong, Iran, Italy, Japan, Kazakhstan, Mexico, Russia, South Korea, Spain,. Switzerland, Thailand and Vietnam among other countries.  The school provides dormitories for students, located down the street from the school building.

Academics
In addition to a traditional curriculum, The Newman School offers an International Baccalaureate Diploma Programme that students may take advantage of in their junior and senior years. The school also offers the IB Middle Years Programme for grades 7-10, and the IB Diploma Programme for grades 11-12.

Athletics
Newman competes in Division B of the Massachusetts Bay Independent League.

Sailing
The sailing team sails out of the CBI boathouse on the Charles River.

Tennis
The Newman tennis team has access to courts affiliated with the Winchester Tennis Club.

Alumni
Marty Walsh, Secretary of Labor under Joe Biden and former mayor of Boston
Charles Taylor (Liberian politician), 22nd president of Liberia
Joe Moakley, Democratic Chairman of the U.S. House Committee on Rules

References

External links
 Official school website; accessed April 22, 2014.

1945 establishments in Massachusetts
Educational institutions established in 1945
High schools in Boston
International Baccalaureate schools in Massachusetts
Private middle schools in Massachusetts
Private high schools in Massachusetts